Barbados participated at the 2018 Summer Youth Olympics in Buenos Aires, Argentina from 6 October to 18 October 2018.

Athletics

Barbados qualified 2 athletes.

Swimming

Barbados qualified 2 athletes.

References

Nations at the 2018 Summer Youth Olympics
Barbados at the Youth Olympics
2018 in Barbadian sport